Justin Long (born 1978) is an American actor.

Justin Long may also refer to:

Justin Long (businessman), American-born skier and businessman